Lost Angel or Lost Angels may refer to:

Lost Angel (film), a 1943 movie starring Margaret O'Brien
Lost Angels, a 1989 independent film
The Lost Angel: Stories, a 1971 collection written by Elizabeth Goudge
Lost Angels (TV series), an American neo-noir crime drama television series renamed Mob City prior to release

Music
Lost Angel (album), the only album of 3rd Strike
"Lost Angel", a song on the 2004 Heart album Jupiters Darling
"Lost Angel", a 2004 single by Day After Tomorrow
"Lost Angels" song by Sweet
"Lost Angels" (song), a 2009 single by Japanese musical artist Gackt

See also
Lost Angeles (disambiguation)